Miguel Couturier (29 September 1950 – 3 January 2012) was a Mexican actor. He appeared in more than 50 films and television shows between 1983 and 2012.

He died on 12 January 2012 from a pancreatic cancer. His son Andrés Couturier is also a cineast.

Selected filmography
 Once Upon a Time in Mexico (2003)
 Zapata: El sueño de un héroe (2004)
 2033 (2009)
 Miss Bala (2011)

References

External links

1950 births
2012 deaths
Mexican male film actors
Male actors from Mexico City
20th-century Mexican male actors